"Sex Type Thing" is the debut single of American rock band Stone Temple Pilots, released from their debut studio album, Core, in 1993. "Sex Type Thing" also appears on the greatest hits compilation album Thank You. The song spawned a music video which received moderate rotation on MTV (at the height of the early 1990s grunge music scene). The single peaked at number 23 on the US Album Rock Tracks chart.

Lyrics and composition
Scott Weiland wrote the lyrics after a girl he was dating was raped by three high school football players after a party. Weiland has stated the song is an anti-rape statement, not a song simply about sex, saying:

According to guitarist Dean DeLeo, the song "In the Light" by Led Zeppelin had a direct influence on the main riff in "Sex Type Thing". In an October 1997 interview in Seconds magazine, Glenn Danzig mentions the similarity of the main riff to the Danzig song "Snakes of Christ".

Live performances
Over the years, "Sex Type Thing" became the band's traditional closer at live shows. During some performances from 1999 until STP's 2002 break-up, the band would extend the song's ending into a jam session where Weiland would strip naked in front of the audience and then wrap his lower body in an American flag.

Music video
During the grunge explosion of the 1990s, the music video for "Sex Type Thing" is usually denoted as the single factor that drove Stone Temple Pilots into the scene. The video was in medium-heavy rotation on MTV during the time, and helped make STP a contender in the grunge era. The video itself hosts a very dark motif, showing the band performing in a dungeon chamber, with singer Scott Weiland having bleached his hair blond, interspersed between clips of a dancer swinging on a chain and a woman surrounded by a ring of fire. This video is rather distinctive because it is the first to showcase Scott Weiland's trademark "dance".<ref>"https://www.youtube.com/watch?v=-s3lmr09oVg
". Music video on Youtube. Retrieved June 13, 2005.  </ref>
The set was used again for Sunny Day Real Estate's "In Circles" music video in 1994.

Controversy
Upon the success of "Sex Type Thing", controversies regarding the song's lyrics emerged while STP was on tour opening for Megadeth. Weiland found himself in the position of defending "Sex Type Thing" to individuals who took the first-person approach he used in the song ("I am a man, a man/I'll give ya something that ya won't forget/I said ya shouldn't have worn that dress") literally. In a 1993 interview with Rolling Stone, Weiland expressed his frustration with the song's reception by saying "It was, 'All right, the "Cop Killer" controversy's dead, let's try to find something else'...I never thought that people would ever seriously think that I was an advocate of date rape."

Track listings
All live tracks were recorded at the Reading Festival 1993.

CD single 1
 "Sex Type Thing" – 3:38
 "Piece of Pie" – 5:28
 "Wicked Garden" (live) – 4:26
 "Sin" (live) – 7:52

CD single 2
 "Sex Type Thing" – 3:38
 "Piece of Pie" – 5:28
 "Dead and Bloated" (live) – 4:53
 "Sex Type Thing" (live) – 4:01

Charts

Release history

Appearances and covers
 The song appeared in notable TV shows and video games including Gran Turismo 2. Charmed, Rock Band 3, Guitar Hero: Aerosmith.
The song has been covered live by Velvet Revolver, a supergroup in which Weiland fronted from 2003 to 2008.
 Evanescence, Fuel, Papa Roach and Theory of a Deadman have also covered the song live.
 "Weird Al" Yankovic covered part of "Sex Type Thing" in his song "The Alternative Polka" off the album Bad Hair Day.
 An electronic reworking of the song appeared in the episode "Let it Bleed" of CSI: Crime Scene Investigation.
 The song was released as downloadable content on June 1, 2010, as part of Stone Temple Pilots Track Pack with "Plush" and "Between the Lines" for Guitar Hero 5.
"Into Sandy's City", a MIDI track from Doom II: Hell on Earth, is based on Sex Type Thing.
Psychosexyal covered this song off the covers álbum Songs to Stalk You By''.

References

External links
 Stone Temple Pilots Official Website – Core
 Lyrics at Lyrics.com

Stone Temple Pilots songs
1992 songs
1993 debut singles
Atlantic Records singles
Obscenity controversies in music
Song recordings produced by Brendan O'Brien (record producer)
Songs about sexual assault
Songs based on actual events
Songs written by Scott Weiland
Songs written by Dean DeLeo
Songs written by Eric Kretz